
Gmina Klukowo is a rural gmina (administrative district) in Wysokie Mazowieckie County, Podlaskie Voivodeship, in north-eastern Poland.

Villages
Gmina Klukowo contains the villages and settlements of Gródek, Janki, Kaliski, Kapłań, Klukowo, Klukowo-Kolonia, Kostry-Podsędkowięta, Kostry-Śmiejki, Kuczyn, Lubowicz Wielki, Lubowicz-Byzie, Lubowicz-Kąty, Łuniewo Małe, Łuniewo Wielkie, Malinowo, Piętki-Basie, Piętki-Gręzki, Piętki-Szeligi, Piętki-Żebry, Sobolewo, Stare Kostry, Stare Warele, Stare Zalesie, Trojanówek, Trojanowo, Usza Mała, Usza Wielka, Wiktorzyn, Wyszonki Kościelne, Wyszonki-Błonie, Wyszonki-Klukówek, Wyszonki-Nagórki, Wyszonki-Włosty, Wyszonki-Wojciechy, Wyszonki-Wypychy, Żabiniec and Żebry Wielkie.

Neighbouring gminas
Gmina Klukowo is bordered by the gminas of Boguty-Pianki, Brańsk, Ciechanowiec, Czyżew-Osada, Rudka and Szepietowo.

References

Polish official population figures 2006

Klukowo
Wysokie Mazowieckie County